Calyptronoma plumeriana is a pinnately compound leaved palm species which is native to Cuba and Hispaniola (both Haiti and the Dominican Republic).

Description
C. plumeriana stems grow singly and reach heights of 4–10 m, with stems 10–20 cm in diameter.  It grows in wet areas near the banks of streams at elevations above 450 m above sea level; below 450 meters on Hispaniola, it is replaced by the related Calyptronoma rivalis.

Use
The petals of the staminate flowers are sometimes collected and eaten.

References

plumeriana
Trees of Cuba
Trees of Haiti
Trees of the Dominican Republic